On September 24, 1815, John Sevier (DR), representative for , died in office.  A special election was held to fill the resulting vacancy December 7–8, 1815.

Election results

Blount took office on January 8, 1816

See also
List of special elections to the United States House of Representatives

References

Tennessee 02
1815
Tennessee 1815 02
1815 Tennessee elections
Tennessee 02
United States House of Representatives 1815 02